Robert Lee Carney (August 3, 1932 – November 9, 2011) was an American basketball player.

He played in West Aurora High School and collegiately for Bradley University.

He was selected by the Milwaukee Hawks in the 6th round (47th pick overall) of the 1954 NBA draft.

He played for the Minneapolis Lakers (1954–55) in the NBA for 19 games.

References

External links

1932 births
2011 deaths
American men's basketball players
Basketball players from Illinois
Bradley Braves men's basketball players
Milwaukee Hawks draft picks
Minneapolis Lakers players
Shooting guards
Sportspeople from Aurora, Illinois